The Erin Shamrocks were a junior ice hockey team based in Erin, Ontario, Canada.  They played in the Georgian Mid-Ontario Junior C Hockey League.

History
The Acton Sabres were founded in 1971 as a member of the South-Central Junior D Hockey League.  In 1973, the league was promoted and changed to the Central Ontario Junior C Hockey League.  In 1976, the league changed its name to the Mid-Ontario Junior C Hockey League, but the Sabres had bigger ambitions and opted out of the league to join the Central Ontario Junior B Hockey League and compete against their local rival the Georgetown Gemini.  The Sabres played in the Central Junior B League until 1984.  They sat out the 1984-85 season before moving down to the Mid-Ontario Junior C Hockey League.  The Sabres were no slouch in Junior B, more often celebrating winning seasons despite the odd losing season.

In 1992, the Acton Sabres moved from Acton to Erin and changed their name to the Erin Shamrocks.

In 1994, the Mid-Ontario Junior C Hockey League merged with the Georgian Bay Junior C Hockey League to create the Georgian Mid-Ontario Junior C Hockey League.  Since 2002, the Shamrocks have been one of the best teams in the entire league.  During the 2004-05 season, the Shamrocks pulled together and won their first Georgian Mid-Ontario league championship.  This allowed for the Shamrocks to push for the dream of winning the All-Ontario championship, the Clarence Schmalz Cup.  They entered the provincial quarter-final against the Western Junior C Hockey League's Wingham Ironmen but ended up losing the series 4-games-to-2.  Later, the Ironmen went on to the final and lost to the Niagara Junior C Hockey League's Grimsby Peach Kings.

The 2005-06 season ended with the Shamrocks finishing in fourth place.  In the league quarter-final, the Shamrocks drew the fifth seed Schomberg Cougars.  The Shamrocks dropped the Cougars 4-games-to-1.  Erin then had to compete against the second seeded Fergus Devils in the league semi-final.  This time the Shamrocks were on the losing end, 4-games-to-1.

In 2006-07, the Shamrocks again ended the season in fourth place.  They entered into the league quarter-final series with the fifth seeded Stayner Siskins and found out that they were too much to handle.  The Siskins dropped the Shamrocks 4-game-to-2.

Season-by-season results

1979-1984
2000-2004
2004–Present

Notable alumni
Jeff Shevalier

Robert mair- played 2009-2012. Franchise all time leading scorer.

References

External links
Shamrocks Webpage

Georgian Mid-Ontario Junior C Hockey League teams
1971 establishments in Ontario
Ice hockey clubs established in 1971